Remmius is a genus of African huntsman spiders that was first described by Eugène Louis Simon in 1897.

Species
 it contains five species, found in Africa:
Remmius badius Roewer, 1961 – Senegal
Remmius praecalvus Simon, 1910 – Congo
Remmius quadridentatus Simon, 1903 – Equatorial Guinea
Remmius vulpinus Simon, 1897 – Cameroon, Congo
Remmius vultuosus Simon, 1897 (type) – Cameroon, Congo

See also
 List of Sparassidae species

References

Araneomorphae genera
Sparassidae
Spiders of Africa